Cyrus Byington (March 11, 1793 – December 31, 1868) was a Christian missionary from Massachusetts who began working with the Choctaw in Mississippi in 1821. Although he had been trained as a lawyer, he abandoned law as a career and became a minister affiliated with the American Board of Commissioners for Foreign Missions. During this period he learned the Choctaw language, which was then entirely unwritten. He also began to develop a Choctaw orthography.

After the U.S. government began enforcing its Indian Removal policy to relocate Native Americans from their lands in the Southeastern states to Indian Territory, later called Oklahoma, during the 19th century, in 1835, Byington and his family returned to the new Choctaw homeland and founded a mission near Eagletown.  He sought to construct a lexicon and develop other linguistic tools for the Choctaw language to translate Christian prayers, hymns, and bible passages. Byington's work is considered one of the most complete lexicons for a Native American language. He worked nearly 50 years translating Choctaw as a written language.

Family
Cyrus met Sophia Nye (1800-1880), the daughter of a prosperous family living in Marietta, Ohio in October 1827. Less than a week after their meeting, he proposed marriage to her (which she apparently did not accept immediately), then left for a preaching tour. During their separation, he wrote passionate letters to her, asking her again to marry him and accompany him back to Mississippi, where he served as a minister to the Choctaws. The letters were obviously persuasive, for the couple married in December 1827 and set off on their life-long partnership shortly afterward.

The Byington family was very susceptible to local illnesses during the early part of their tenure at Eagletown. Cyrus and his wife both fell critically ill several times. Cyrus' sister joined the mission in 1839, but died of illness a few weeks later. Their elder son died in 1840, at the age of eleven, while their younger son died in 1846 at the age of two and a half.

Career
Cyrus Byington spent much of his adult life at Eagletown. Like many of his fellow missionaries, he worried over conflicting loyalties between his church superiors, who were adamantly opposed to slavery, and his Choctaw followers, whose families were slave owners. Arguments over slavery intensified throughout the 1850s. Sponsors of the missions, such as the ABCFM, demanded that their missionaries speak out against slavery. However, the government of the Choctaw Nation threatened to expel any who did so. When the missionaries declared they would remain, the sponsors cut off financial support. Byington reportedly said this experience was "like death." Byington defiantly stayed at his post. He published his Choctaw Definer, made up of English words and Choctaw equivalents, in 1852 but his Grammar and Dictionary were not printed until after his death. Meanwhile he continued his normal missionary duties and medical work. Byington expected to continue working at the mission after the end of the Civil War. However, he became so seriously ill, that people at the mission feared he was about to die. He caught smallpox during the trip and had to be quarantined for a month after arriving in Ohio. His wife, who had remained in charge of the Eagleton mission while awaiting the arrival of a new missionary, finally rejoined Cyrus in the spring of 1867.

Death and legacy
Somehow, Byington completed his translation of the first five books of the Bible into Choctaw and personally delivered them to the printer in New York City. He returned to Ohio in the spring of 1868, and resumed work on the 7th edition of his Choctaw Grammar. He was still working on this when he died on December 31, 1868. The grammar book could not be published until 1871, but handwritten copies were made by others for missionaries to use in the meanwhile.

Byington's linguistic work

The Choctaw language is a member of the Muskogean family and was well known among the frontiersmen, such as US President Andrew Jackson and William Henry Harrison. The language is closely related to Chickasaw; some linguists consider the two varieties a single language. The following table is an example of Choctaw text and its translation:

Orthography
The written Choctaw language is based upon English version of the Roman alphabet and was developed in conjunction with the civilization program of the United States in the early 19th century. Byington's alphabet and a version modified by John Swanton is seen here.

Byington (Original)

Byington/Swanton (Linguistic)

Works
English and Choctaw Definer (Holisso Anumpa Tosholi), 1852
Grammar of the Choctaw Language, 1870
"A dictionary of the Choctaw language" (Choctaw/English and English/Choctaw), 1915

See also
 Timothy H. Ball
 William Bartram
 Horatio B. Cushman
 Angie Debo
 Frances Densmore
 Henry S. Halbert
 Gideon Lincecum
 John R. Swanton

Notes

References

External links
Cyrus Byington Biography
Encyclopedia of Oklahoma History and Culture - Byington, Cyrus

1793 births
1868 deaths
Linguists from the United States
People from McCurtain County, Oklahoma
Place of birth missing
Place of death missing
Linguists of Muskogean languages
Pre-statehood history of Oklahoma